Milliken & Company is an American industrial manufacturer that has been in business since 1865. With corporate headquarters located in Spartanburg, South Carolina, the company is active across a breadth of disciplines including specialty chemical, floor covering, performance and protective textile materials, and healthcare.

Milliken employs many scientists, including a large number with masters and doctoral degrees. Milliken has been granted more than 2,500 U.S. patents and more than 5,500 patents worldwide.

History

In 1865, Seth M. Milliken and William Deering founded Deering Milliken Company, a small woolen fabrics distributor in Portland, Maine. In 1868, Milliken moved the company headquarters to New York City, at that time the heart of the American textile industry. In 1884, the company invested in a new facility in Pacolet, South Carolina, and from that investment the manufacturing operations grew.  Milliken & Company headquarters moved to Spartanburg, South Carolina in 1958 and included a dedicated research center on campus. Today, the company operates in a number of diverse disciplines, including specialty chemicals, performance and protective textiles, floor coverings, specialty fabrics, healthcare, and business consulting services. In 2018, Sage Automotive Interiors was carved out of Milliken & Company and became a separate entity.

From 1956 until 1980 Milliken & Company (then operating as Deering Milliken) was involved in one of the ugliest and most drawn-out affairs in the history of labor relations. In 1956 company president Roger Milliken closed the Darlington SC mill in response to the workers voting to bring in the Textile Workers Union of America to represent them after Milliken had imposed several changes to working conditions that were unfavorable to the workers. The case was argued all the way to the U.S. Supreme Court. In 1980 Milliken & Company paid $5 million to the former workers to settle the matter.

Company leadership
Roger Milliken became president of the company on the death of his father in 1947 and served in that capacity until 1983, when he became chairman and chief executive officer of Milliken & Company, naming Dr. Thomas J. Malone as president and chief operating officer. In 2002, Malone retired, and Dr. Ashley Allen was named president and COO, becoming CEO in 2006 as Milliken stepped aside from daily management. In 2008, Allen retired and was succeeded by Dr. Joe Salley. In October 2016, J. Harold Chandler, who has served on Milliken's board for over a decade, was appointed as chairman, and interim president and chief executive officer. On July 11, 2018, it was announced that Halsey Moon Cook Jr. will take the helm as Milliken's next President and CEO, Effective September 1, 2018. Harold Chandler will continue in his role as chairman of the board.

Most Ethical Company Claim 
As of February 2020, Milliken & Company celebrated 14 years as one of the "World's Most Ethical Companies", according to the Ethisphere Institute which describes itself as "a global leader in defining and advancing the standards of ethical business practices."   However, the Ethisphere Institute has been criticized by the Los Angeles Times for accepting money from the companies they rate.  The integrity of the rating methodology used by the Ethisphere Institute was called into question by an article in Slate magazine.

Manufacturing base
Milliken & Company has more than 7,000 associates and operated over 40 manufacturing facilities in the United States, United Kingdom, Belgium, France, Germany, Mexico and China.
Milliken serves a variety of industries including healthcare, transportation, building and infrastructure, hospitality, industrial manufacturing, architecture and design, and specialty chemicals.

Industrial musicals 

From 1956 to 1980, Milliken sponsored an annual company musical, the Milliken Breakfast Show, at the Waldorf-Astoria for its buyers to launch the new season.  Stars who appeared in these productions included Ginger Rogers, Rene Auberjonois, Dom DeLuise, Bert Lahr, Ann Miller, Gwen Verdon, Dorothy Loudon, Sarah Jessica Parker, Chita Rivera, Donald O'Connor, Juliet Prowse, and Tommy Tune. The cost of these productions could exceed the cost of a public Broadway show. For example, the 1970 production on the lighter side of garment manufacturing life, directed by Peter Howard, cost nearly $1 million for 13 performances, with an audience of approximately 25,000 Milliken buyers. No recordings of these musicals are known to exist.

Advertising
The company produced ads in the 1970s until the 1990s with Barbara Mandrell featuring the company's chemically treated fabrics under the name Visa "America's freedom fabric" as was the slogan.

References

External links
 Milliken & Company Website
 Milliken Healthcare Products, LLC Website

 
Privately held companies based in South Carolina
Textile companies of the United States
Companies based in South Carolina
Companies based in Spartanburg, South Carolina